Leonard Baskin (August 15, 1922 – June 3, 2000) was an American sculptor, draughtsman and graphic artist, as well as founder of the Gehenna Press (1942–2000). One of America's first fine arts presses, it went on to become "one of the most important and comprehensive art presses of the world", often featuring the work of celebrated poets, such as Sylvia Plath, Ted Hughes, Anthony Hecht, and James Baldwin side by side with Baskin's  bold, stark, energetic and often dramatic black-and-white prints. Called a "Sculptor of Stark Memorials" by the New York Times, Baskin is also known for his wood, limestone, bronze, and large-scale woodblock prints, which ranged from naturalistic to fanciful, and were frequently grotesque, featuring bloated figures or humans merging with animals. "His monumental bronze sculpture, The Funeral Cortege, graces the Franklin Delano Roosevelt Memorial in Washington, D.C."

Major work 

A committed figurative artist, and the son and brother of rabbis, Baskin's work often focused on mortality, Judaism, the Holocaust and other angst-ridden themes. Repeating a Baskin quote first published in Time magazine, the New York Times' Roberta Smith cites it to explain Baskin's allegiance to figurative work and respect for tradition, which was at odds with the abstract expressionist movement that dominated modern art for many decades of his life, and which he firmly rejected:Our human frame, our gutted mansion, our enveloping sack of beef and ash is yet a glory. Glorious in defining our universal sodality and in defining our utter uniqueness. The human figure is the image of all men and of one man. It contains all and can express all.As a young man, at the height of the flowering Boston Expressionist movement centered around the city's  Boris Mirski Gallery, Baskin had his first major solo exhibition there in 1956, on the heels of being one of 11 artists featured in the opening exhibition at the Terrain Gallery.  He would go on to participate in another 40 exhibitions. Within a decade, he was featured in the 1966 documentary "Images of Leonard Baskin" by American filmmaker Warren Forma. In 1972, Baskin won a Caldecott honor for his illustrations of Hosie’s Alphabet, written by his wife, Lisa, and sons Tobias and Hosea, and published by Viking Press. In 1994, he received one of his most important commissions for a 30-foot bas relief for the Franklin Delano Roosevelt Memorial and a bronze statue of a seated figure, also erected in 1994, for the Holocaust Memorial in Ann Arbor, Michigan.

The Gehenna Press 

Baskin founded the Gehenna Press in 1942, one of the first fine art presses in the US, as a student at Yale, inspired by the illustrated books of William Blake which so impressed him he decided to learn to print and make his own books. The name was taken from a line in Paradise Lost: "and black Gehenna call'd, the type of hell". The Gehenna Press printed over 100 books and ran until Baskin's death in 2000.

In 1974, Baskin moved with his family to Britain, to Lurley Manor, near Tiverton, Devon, to be close to his friend Ted Hughes, for whom he had illustrated the poetry volume Crow published in 1970. Baskin and Hughes collaborated on several further works, including A Primer of Birds, published by Gehenna Press in 1981. Other poets who collaborated with the Gehenna Press included James Baldwin, Anthony Hecht and Ruth Fainlight. Sylvia Plath dedicated "Sculptor" to Leonard Baskin in her work, The Colossus and Other Poems (1960).

"In 1992, a 50-year retrospective of Gehenna Press books toured the country, including a major exhibition at the Library of Congress."

Academic affiliations 
Having vowed to become a sculptor at the age of 15, Baskin studied sculpting as an apprentice to Maurice Glickman from 1937 to 1939 at the Educational Alliance in New York City. Baskin studied at the New York University School of Architecture and Applied Arts from 1939 to 1941. In 1941, he won a scholarship to Yale where he studied for two years, and founded the Gehenna Press.

Baskin served in the US Navy during the final years of World War II, and then in the Merchant Navy. He then studied at The New School for Social Research, where he obtained his B.A. in 1949.  "In 1950 he went to Paris where he studied at the Academie de la Grande Chaumiere, and the following year to Florence to work at the Accademia di Belle Arti."

Between 1952 and 1953, he was an instructor in printmaking at the Worcester Art Museum where he taught the artists Joyce Reopel and Mel Zabarsky. In 1953, he began a twenty-year career teaching printmaking and sculpture at Smith College in Northampton, Massachusetts. He was also a member of the Society of American Graphic Artists.  After spending several years in the 1970s in England, Baskin returned to the U.S. in 1984, and subsequently taught at Hampshire College in Amherst, Massachusetts.

Public collections 
Baskin's work is held by major museums worldwide, including the American Numismatic Society, the Amon Carter Museum, the Art Institute of Chicago, the Art Museum of Southeast Texas, Boca Raton Museum of Art, the British Museum, Brooklyn Museum, Brooks Memorial Art Gallery, Detroit Institute of Arts, Hirshhorn Museum and Sculpture Garden, the Honolulu Museum of Art, Indianapolis Museum of Art, the Jewish Museum, the Library of Congress, Metropolitan Museum of Art, MOMA, Museum of Fine Arts, Boston, Muscarelle Museum of Art, the National Gallery of Art, the New Jersey State Museum, The Newark Museum of Art, Princeton University, Seattle Art Museum, Smithsonian American Art Museum, the Udinotti Museum of Figurative Art, Victoria and Albert Museum, the Vatican Museums, Wesleyan University, Whitney Museum of American Art, and the Worcester Art Museum.

The archive of his work at the Gehenna Press was acquired by the Bodleian Library at Oxford, England, in 2009. "A catalogue raisonné of Baskin's graphic works includes 739 works,"  and the McMaster Museum of Art in Hamilton, Ontario owns over 200 of his works, most of which were donated by his brother Rabbi Bernard Baskin. The Philadelphia Museum of Art has a collection of over 800 of his works.

Awards and honors  
Baskin was the recipient of six honorary doctorates, and a member of various national and royal academies in Belgium, Italy, and U.S. The National Foundation of Jewish Culture in the U.S. presented him with its Jewish Cultural Achievement Award in Visual Arts in 2000. Other honors and commendations include the:

 Alonzo C. Mather Prize, Art Institute of Chicago
 American Academy of Arts and Sciences, Fellow
 Gold Medal of The American Academy of Arts and Letters
 Gold Medal of the National Academy of Design
 Guggenheim Fellowship in Creative Printings
 Louis Comfort Tiffany Foundation Fellowship for Sculpture
 National Academy of Design, elected an Associate in 1985; became full member in 1994
 Ohara Museum Prize
 Prix de Rome, Honorable Mention for Sculpture
 Special Medal of Merit of the American Institute of Graphic Arts
 Widener Medal from the Pennsylvania Academy of the Fine Art

Personal life 
Baskin was born in New Brunswick, NJ. When Baskin was seven, the family relocated to the Jewish Orthodox section of Williamsburg in Brooklyn, New York.  Baskin was first cousin to American modern dancer and choreographer Sophie Maslow. His first wife Esther Baskin, a nature writer, the author of Creatures of Darkness and The Poppy and Other Deadly Plants, and mother to son Tobias, died in 1973 at age 47. Baskin died at age 77 on June 3, 2000, in Northampton, where he resided. He was survived by his second wife Lisa Unger Baskin and their two children Hosea and Lucretia.

References

Further reading
 Alan Fern, Judith O'Sullivan, Ted Hughes, The Complete Prints of Leonard Baskin: a catalogue raisonné 1948-1983, Boston: Little, Brown, and Company, 1984
 Lance Hidy, "My Studies at the Free Academy of Gehenna", in Parenthesis; 21 (2011 Autumn), p. 5–11.
 Barbara Blumenthal, "Arno Werner, Leonard Baskin, Harold P. McGrath and the Tradition of Book Arts in Massachusetts", in Parenthesis; 21 (2011 Autumn), p. 17–20.
 Sidney Berger, "Leonard Baskin and the Art of Printing (The Ego and the Ecstasy)", in Parenthesis; 17 (2009 Autumn), pp. 13–19.
 Bruce Chandler, Lance Hidy, Barry Moser, In the School of Baskin (2008. Society of Printers, Boston, USA)
 Lisa Unger Baskin, The Gehenna Press: The Work of Fifty Years, 1942–1992 [exhibition catalogue].
 Central Conference of American Rabbis, A Passover Haggadah: The New Union Haggadah with drawings by Leonard Baskin, New York: Viking Press, 1982.
 Jaffe, Irma B., The Sculpture of Leonard Baskin, New York, Viking Press, 1980.

External links

 The official web site of Leonard Baskin; The Gehenna Press; Gehenna Prints (leonardbaskin.com)
 Leonard Baskin biography, chronology, etc at Galerie St. Etienne – official representative of the Estate of Leonard Baskin
 "Medea & Her Sisters: Leonard Baskin's Images of Women" – 2007 exhibition at the Smith College Museum of Art
 Leonard Baskin & The Gehenna Press at Brandeis University 
 Artifex: Leonard Baskin and the Gehenna Press at Cornell University
 Leonard Baskin at R. Michelson Galleries 
 Leonard Baskin at Annex Galleries (20 search hits)
 
  (and Gehenna Press, 70 records)
 Hughes-Baskin Papers at the British Library
 Leonard Baskin broadsides and prints at the Mortimer Rare Book Collection, Smith College Special Collections

1922 births
2000 deaths
20th-century American male artists
20th-century American printmakers
American printmakers
20th-century American sculptors
AIGA medalists
Jewish American artists
Cultural history of Boston
Fellows of the American Academy of Arts and Sciences
Hampshire College faculty
Modern sculptors
Smith College faculty
Yale University alumni
American male sculptors
American wood engravers
Boston expressionism
Private press movement people
United States Navy personnel of World War II
20th-century American Jews
Neo-expressionist artists
20th-century engravers
Members of the American Academy of Arts and Letters